The 2018–19 Liga I is the 29th season of the top level women's football league of the Romanian football league system. It will decide the Romanian champions and UEFA Women's Champions League participant.

Olimpia Cluj are the defending champions.

Team changes

To Liga I
Promoted from Liga II
 Universitatea Galați
 Independența Baia Mare

From Liga I
Relegated to Liga II
 Târgu Mureș
 Real Craiova

Stadiums by capacity

Stadiums by locations

Regular season
In the regular season the 10 teams will meet twice, a total of 18 matches per team, with the top 3 advancing to the Championship round and the bottom 7 qualifying for Relegation round.

Table

Results

Positions by round

Championship round
The top three teams from Regular season will meet twice (4 matches per team) for a place in 2019–20 UEFA Women's Champions League as well as deciding the league champion. Teams start the Championship round with their points from the Regular season halved, rounded upwards, and no other records carried over from the Regular season.

Table

Results

Positions by round

Lower table round
The teams ranked from 4th to 6th in the Regular season will meet twice (4 matches per team) for deciding the final league rankings. Teams start the Lower table round with their points from the Regular season halved, rounded upwards, and no other records carried over from the Regular season.

Table

Results

Positions by round

Relegation round
The bottom three teams from Regular season (without 10 place, which was excluded) will meet twice (4 matches per team) to contest against relegation. Teams start the Relegation round with their points from the Regular season halved, rounded upwards, and no other records carried over from the Regular season.

Table

Results

Positions by round

References

External links
 fotbalfeminin.net 

Rom
Fem
Romanian Superliga (women's football) seasons